Georgi Georgiev (born 12 October 1988) is a Bulgarian professional footballer who plays as a goalkeeper for Cherno More Varna and the Bulgaria national team.

Career

Tiraspol 
On 1 July 2011, Georgiev signed a two-year contract with FC Tiraspol following a successful trial period with the club. He quickly became the first choice goalkeeper. Georgiev made his league debut in a 1–0 away loss against Olimpia Bălţi on 23 July 2011.

On 9 January 2013, Georgiev signed a one-year contract extension, keeping him at Tiraspol until 2014. On 26 May, Georgiev led Tiraspol out as captain in the 2013 Moldovan Cup Final, which they won 6–4 after penalties against Veris Drăgăneşti. He played an important role in the penalty shootout held after the teams remained tied 2–2 after extra time, making two saves.

Sheriff Tiraspol 
Georgiev signed with Sheriff Tiraspol on 13 June 2013 on a three-year deal, for an undisclosed fee.

Tiraspol (loan)
On 15 August 2013, Georgiev was loaned out to his previous club FC Tiraspol.

Dacia Chișinău
On 31 July 2017, Georgiev signed a -year contract with Moldovan club Dacia Chișinău.

Slavia Sofia
He became part of the Slavia Sofia team in February 2019.

Levski Sofia
On 28 February 2020, Georgiev returned to his boyhood club Levski Sofia, signing a 2,5-year contract.

International career
On 14 November 2019, Georgiev earned his first cap for Bulgaria, playing full 90 minutes in a 0–1 home loss against Paraguay in a friendly match.

Honours

Club 
 FC Tiraspol
Moldovan Cup (1): 2012–13

 Botev Plovdiv
Bulgarian Cup (1): 2016–17

References

External links
 

1988 births
Living people
People from Shumen
Bulgarian footballers
Bulgaria international footballers
PFC Lokomotiv Mezdra players
OFC Sliven 2000 players
FC Tiraspol players
FC Sheriff Tiraspol players
Naft Masjed Soleyman F.C. players
Gostaresh Foulad F.C. players
Botev Plovdiv players
FC Dacia Chișinău players
OFC Pirin Blagoevgrad players
FC Vereya players
PFC Slavia Sofia players
PFC Levski Sofia players
PFC Cherno More Varna players
First Professional Football League (Bulgaria) players
Moldovan Super Liga players
Persian Gulf Pro League players
Bulgarian expatriate footballers
Bulgarian expatriate sportspeople in Moldova
Expatriate footballers in Moldova
Expatriate footballers in Iran
Association football goalkeepers